Lihuelistata is a monotypic genus of South American crevice weavers containing the single species, Lihuelistata metamerica. It was first described by M. J. Ramírez & C. J. Grismado in 1997, and has only been found in Argentina.

References

Filistatidae
Monotypic Araneomorphae genera
Spiders of Argentina